Anne Fontaine is a women's fashion brand. The company is based in France, and its products include clothing, shoes, handbags and accessories.

Founder and namesake

Fontaine has been the recipient of several awards, including the French National Order of Merit and received the award of l'élan de Mode in 2006 (French Federation of Fashion)

In 2011, Fontaine created the New York-based Anne Fontaine Foundation, to support the protection of endangered forests and promote reforestation.  The Foundation's projects are focused on the Brazilian Atlantic forest, also known as the Mata Atlântica.

History
Anne Fontaine opened their first boutique in the Rive Gauche section of Paris in 1994. Since the opening of the original store, Anne Fontaine has expanded to 85 boutiques worldwide including Paris, Tokyo and New York City.

References

External links
Official Website
Flag Leggings

Clothing brands
Clothing companies established in 1993
High fashion brands
Clothing companies of France
Clothing brands of France
Companies based in Normandy